Georges Courtès (24 April 1925 – 31 October 2019) was a French astronomer and a member of the French Academy of Sciences.

Career
Georges Courtès was born in Toul, Meurthe-et-Moselle, and devoted his career to imaging and spectrography in ground and space astrophysics.

References

1925 births
2019 deaths
20th-century French astronomers
People from Toul